Weymouth College was a public school in Weymouth, Dorset, England, from 1863 to 1940. It closed during the Second World War because of the risks from its proximity to naval bases at Weymouth and Portsmouth, and the boys and some staff moved to Wellingborough School in Northamptonshire. A new house was formed at Wellingborough to accommodate the 33 pupils who moved, and Weymouth House still exists; since 1989 it has been the girls' house of the school.

Weymouth College aimed "to provide for the sons of gentlemen a classical, mathematical and general  education of the highest class".

The building was designed by George Rackstraw Crickmay in 1864. Pevsner described the building as "The High Victorian style in a very debased form", and the chapel, 1894-96 as "really no better". In 1972 the building was in use as a College of Education. It is now a residential conversion. Some of the chapel furnishings are in St Aldhelm's Church, Radipole, Weymouth.

Former pupils
Notable former pupils include:

Louis Leakey, archaeologist and naturalist
Nigel Malim, Royal Navy admiral 
C. F. D. Moule, theologian
George Stainforth, flying speed record breaker
Henry Sturmey, co-inventor of Sturmey-Archer bicycle hub
Francis Warman, Archdeacon of Aston 1965–1977
John Phillips, Bishop of Portsmouth 1960–1975
Hugh Gough, Archbishop of Sydney 1959–1964
J. Meade Falkner, author of Moonfleet
C. F. G. Masterman, Liberal party politician and Cabinet Minister
Andrew Wood Wilkinson, paediatrician

Notes

Educational institutions established in 1862
Educational institutions disestablished in 1940
Schools in Weymouth, Dorset
Defunct schools in Dorset
1862 establishments in England